William Tyson (born 17 May 1971) is a South African windsurfer. He competed in the men's Lechner A-390 event at the 1992 Summer Olympics.

References

External links
 

1971 births
Living people
South African male sailors (sport)
South African windsurfers
Olympic sailors of South Africa
Sailors at the 1992 Summer Olympics – Lechner A-390
Place of birth missing (living people)